Vincent River is a one act stage play by Philip Ridley. It was Ridley's fourth stage play for adults and premiered at the Hampstead Theatre, London on 6 September 2000. The production was the last major collaboration between Ridley and director Mathew Lloyd, who had previously directed the majority of Ridley's other theatrical works.

It is believed that the play in part draws from Ridley's unpublished radio play October Scars the Skin which was broadcast on BBC Radio 4 on 16 January 1989. The story like Vincent River involved a mother of a murdered homosexual who befriends his son's lover and also featured a character called Vincent.

Plot

The story plays out in realtime and is set in a rundown flat in Dagenham.

There a woman called Anita is moving in following the death of Vincent, her son who was killed in a homophobic attack which resulted in her discovering that he was a homosexual in the aftermath of his murder.

In the play we see her interact with Davey, a boy who claims to have been the first to find Vincent's corpse and who wants to know as much as he can about Vincent from Anita.

Notable Stage Productions

On Film
In 2005 Marianne Epin and Cyrille Thouvenin starred in the play at the Théâtre du Marais in Paris, which was also filmed and released as a television movie. It is available on region 2 DVD.

The play has been compared to the 2014 film, Lilting, starring Ben Whishaw, Cheng Pei Pei and Andrew Leung and written and directed by Hong Khaou. The story similar to the play is about a man who approaches the mother of his deceased gay lover to try and connect and understand their loss.

References

Further reading

External links
 Interview from 2010 with Philip Ridley for Time Out London about Vincent River and homophobic violence in London 

2000 plays
Plays by Philip Ridley
One-act plays
Two-handers
LGBT-related plays
Plays set in London